Sung Nak-so is a female former international table tennis player from South Korea.

Table tennis career
She won a silver medal in the Corbillon Cup (women's Team event) at the 1975 World Table Tennis Championships with Chung Hyun-sook, Lee Ailesa and Kim Soon-ok for South Korea.

See also
 List of World Table Tennis Championships medalists

References

South Korean female table tennis players
Living people
World Table Tennis Championships medalists
Year of birth missing (living people)
20th-century South Korean women